Yana Urqu (Quechua yana black, urqu mountain, "black mountain", Hispanicized spelling Yanaorcco) is a  mountain in the Andes of Peru. It is located in the Huancavelica Region, Huancavelica Province, Huacocolpa District. Yana Urqu lies southeast of Chapi Urqu and northeast of Inqhana.

References

Mountains of Huancavelica Region
Mountains of Peru